McCooey is a surname. Notable people with the surname include:

Art McCooey (1738–1773), Irish poet
David McCooey (born 1967), Australian poet
Frank McCooey (1888–1962), Australian rules footballer
John H. McCooey (1864–1934), New York politician
Matt McCooey (born 1981), English-Japanese actor
Richard McCooey (1930–2014), American restauranteur